Boiany (Boyan) is a village in Chernivtsi Raion, Chernivtsi Oblast (province) of western Ukraine. It is located close to Sadagura in the historic region of Bukovina. It hosts the administration of Boiany rural hromada, one of the hromadas of Ukraine. 

It was the ancestral estate of Ion Neculce, chronicler of the history of the Principality of Moldavia in the 18th century.

History 
According to legend, the village was founded by a forester raising oxen (boi in Romanian) in a glade. In the Middle Ages, trade route linking Cernăuți (now Chernivtsi) with Iași passed through the village. The village is first officially attested in a document dated 8 April 1528 by Petru Rareș, ruler of Moldavia.
The Boian estate is given as a wedding gift to Ion Neculce's mother, Catrina Cantacuzino, together with Cernauca and 21 other villages. Upon Neculce's flight and exile in Russia, the estate was confiscated and given to another nobleman, but in 1720 Neculce was granted permission to return to Moldavia. He then proceeded to sue the new owner and managed to convince the court to return the Boian estate to him.

Until 18 July 2020, Boiany belonged to Novoselytsia Raion. The raion was abolished in July 2020 as part of the administrative reform of Ukraine, which reduced the number of raions of Chernivtsi Oblast to three. The area of Novoselytsia Raion was split between Chernivtsi and Dnistrovskyi Raions, with Boiany being transferred to Chernivtsi Raion.

Jewish community

The Hasidic dynasty of Boyan was founded here in 1887 by Rabbi Yitzchok Friedman (1850–1917), eldest son of the first Sadigura Rebbe, Rabbi Avrohom Yaakov Friedman (1820–1883). Upon the death of his father in 1883, Rabbi Yitzchok and his brother Rabbi Yisrael (1852–1907) assumed joint leadership of their father's Hasidim. Although they were content with this arrangement, many of the Sadigura Hasidim preferred to have one Rebbe, and in 1887, the brothers agreed to draw lots to determine who would stay in Sadigura and who would leave. The lots fell to Rabbi Yisrael to remain as the second Sadigura Rebbe, while Rabbi Yitzchok moved to the neighboring town of Boiany (Boyan) and established his court there, becoming the first Boyaner Rebbe. Under his leadership, Boyaner Hasidut flourished. Boyaner communities were established in nearby towns as well as in Tiberias, Safed, and Jerusalem, Israel.

At the beginning of World War I, the town of Boyan was completely destroyed and the Rebbe and his family escaped to Vienna, where the Rebbe died in 1917. After the war ended, his four sons each moved to a different country to establish their court. Boyaner Hasidut continues today under the leadership of Rabbi Nachum Dov Brayer, great-grandson of the first Boyaner Rebbe, who lives in Jerusalem.

Monuments
The village has a bust of Ion Neculce and a monument to the victims of Communist oppression.

Emigration 
Due to poor economic conditions, some villagers started immigrating to Canada in the late 1880s; by 1913, at least 983 people had left the village. Many of them settled in the province of Alberta and founded a village with the same name, Boian.

References

External links 
  Cronicarul Ion Niculce si Boianul - o dragoste reciproca -- part of Boianul din Bukovina, an excellent Romanian-language website with much detail about history, customs, monuments and emigration 
 Old Photos of Boiany

Populated places on the Prut
Romanian communities in Ukraine
Shtetls
Duchy of Bukovina
Bukovina
Villages in Chernivtsi Raion